Hemistola simplex is a moth of the family Geometridae. It is endemic to  Taiwan.

References

Moths described in 1899
Endemic fauna of Taiwan
Boarmiini
Moths of Taiwan